A Star Is Born is the soundtrack album to the 1976 musical film of the same name, performed by its stars Barbra Streisand and Kris Kristofferson. The album was very successful, holding the number-one spot on the US Billboard 200 chart for six weeks and eventually was certified 4× Platinum by the RIAA for more than four million units shipped and has sold a total of eight million copies worldwide.

"Evergreen (Love Theme from A Star Is Born)" was released as the album's lead single and became Streisand's second US number one single, spending three weeks at the top of the Billboard Hot 100 and six weeks atop the easy listening chart.

According to the liner notes of Streisand's compilation box set Just for the Record, the album also received a record certification in New Zealand, Brazil, the Netherlands, Italy and Mexico. The import version of the CD adds the Spanish version of "Evergreen" as a bonus track.

Track listing
 "Watch Closely Now" (Paul Williams, Kenny Ascher) – 3:49
 "Queen Bee" (Rupert Holmes) – 3:55
 "Everything" (Holmes, Williams) – 3:50
 "Lost Inside of You" (Barbra Streisand, Leon Russell) – 2:54
 "Hellacious Acres" (Williams, Ascher) – 2:58
 "Evergreen (Love Theme from A Star Is Born)" (Streisand, Williams) – 3:04
 "The Woman in the Moon" (Williams, Ascher) – 4:49
 "I Believe in Love" (Kenny Loggins, Alan and Marilyn Bergman) – 3:13
 "Crippled Crow" (Donna Weiss) – 3:30
 Finale: "With One More Look at You" / "Watch Closely Now" (Williams, Ascher) – 7:43
 Reprise: "Evergreen (Love Theme from A Star Is Born)" – 1:46
 "Evergreen (Love theme from A Star Is Born)" (Spanish version) – 3:05 (Import version only)

 The songs that appear on the soundtrack are in most cases alternate (live) and studio recordings that do not appear in the film. The alternate version of "Lost Inside of You" that actually appears in the movie, was finally released in 1991 as part of the 4-CD Barbra Streisand Anthology Just for the Record. A previously unreleased studio version of the track appeared on her 1982 compilation Memories. It was later re-recorded as a duet with Babyface for her 2014 duets album Partners.
 An alternative previously unreleased studio version of the track "With One More Look at You" appears on Streisand's 2012 retrospective Release Me.

Personnel
The Speedway
Art Munson, Bobby Shew, Booker T. Jones, Charles Owens, Dean Hagen, Donnie Fritts, Jack Redmond, Jerry McGee, Michael Utley, Sammy Creason, Stephen Bruton, Terry Paul – performers
The Oreos
Clydie King, Vanetta Fields – backing vocals
with:
Ian Freebairn-Smith, James Pankow, Kenny Ascher, Patrick Williams, Roger Kellaway, Tom Scott – orchestration 
Jules Chaikin – musical contractor
Francesco Scavullo – front cover photography

Charts

Weekly charts

Year-end charts

Certifications and sales

}
}

}
}

References

1976 soundtrack albums
Barbra Streisand soundtracks
Albums produced by Phil Ramone
Columbia Records soundtracks
Albums arranged by Patrick Williams (composer)
Albums recorded at A&M Studios
Musical film soundtracks
Romance film soundtracks
Drama film soundtracks